An election to the Assembly of London took place on 10 June 2004, along with the 2004 London mayoral election.

The Assembly is elected by the Additional Member System. There are fourteen directly elected constituencies, nine of which were won by the Conservatives and five by the Labour Party.  An additional eleven members were allocated by a London wide top-up vote, with the proviso that parties must win at least 5% of the vote to qualify for list seats.  This latter rule prevented both the British National Party and the Respect Party from winning a seat each as both fell just short of the 5% threshold.

This election saw losses for Labour and the Greens and gains for both the Liberal Democrats and UKIP, who achieved their first representation in the Assembly since its creation in 2000.

Results

|-
!rowspan=3 colspan=2 | Parties
!colspan=10 | Additional member system
!rowspan=2 colspan=5 | Total seats
|-
!colspan=5 |Constituency
!colspan=5 |Region
|-
! Votes !! % !! +/− !! Seats !! +/− 
! Votes !! % !! +/− !! Seats !! +/−
! Total !! +/− !! %
|-

|-
|   || Total || 1,802,537 ||  ||  || 14 ||   || 1,873,166 ||  ||   || 11 ||  || 25 ||   ||
|}

The Conservative Party gained Brent and Harrow from Labour (who lost 7.6% of their vote), however they lost it again in the 2008 election. There were also large swings away from Labour in Barnet and Camden, City and East, Ealing and Hillingdon, Greenwich and Lewisham, Havering and Redbridge and West Central. The Liberal Democrats lost votes in most constituencies, but made gains in Enfield and Haringey, Lambeth and Southwark and Merton and Wandsworth.  UKIP gained large percentages of the vote in Bexley and Bromley, Croydon and Sutton, Greenwich and Lewisham and Havering and Redbridge.

 Overall turnout: 36.97%

London Assembly representation

New members
 Bob Blackman (Conservative Party, Brent and Harrow)
 Dee Doocey (Liberal Democrats, London list)
 Damian Hockney (UK Independence Party, London list)
 Peter Hulme-Cross (UK Independence Party, London list)
 Joanne McCartney (Labour Party, Enfield and Haringey)
 Murad Qureshi (Labour Party, London list)

Defeated members
 Toby Harris (Labour Party, Brent and Harrow)
 Samantha Heath (Labour Party, London list)
 Noel Lynch (Green Party of England and Wales, London list)
 Eric Ollerenshaw (Conservative Party, London list)

Retiring members
 Meg Hillier (Labour Party, North East)
 Diana Johnson (Labour Party, London list)

London-wide lists

References

External links
Guardian (newspaper): collection of manifestos
MayorWatch London Elections Guide

2004 elections in the United Kingdom
Assembly election
2004
June 2004 events in the United Kingdom